Samuel Dale (1772–1841) was an American frontiersman, general, and member of the Alabama and Mississippi state legislatures.

Samuel Dale may also refer to:

Samuel Dale (physician) (1659–1739), English naturalist and physician
Samuel F. Dale (1773–1842), American surveyor, militiaman, judge, and legislator from Pennsylvania
Samuel F. Dale (1816–1876), son of the above, namesake of the historic Samuel F. Dale House
Samuel Dale (Iowa politician) (1798–1878), member of the Iowa State Senate (see 1856 Iowa Senate election)

See also
Dale Samuels, American football quarterback